Matías Sánchez may refer to:

 Matías Sánchez (footballer, born 1979), Argentine footballer
 Matías Sánchez (footballer, born 1983), Argentine footballer
 Matías Sánchez (footballer, born 1987), Argentine footballer for Melbourne Victory FC
 Matías Sánchez (footballer, born 1990), Chilean footballer for San Marcos de Arica
 Matías Sánchez (footballer, born 1996), Argentine footballer for Club Atlético Lanús
 Matías Sánchez (volleyball), Argentine volleyball player